The Fatal Glass of Beer is a 1916 American short comedy film directed by Tod Browning.

Cast
 Jack Brammall as John
 Elmo Lincoln
 Tully Marshall as Cousin Henry
 Teddy Sampson as Nell

References

External links

1916 films
1916 comedy films
1916 short films
American silent short films
American black-and-white films
Films directed by Tod Browning
Silent American comedy films
American comedy short films
1910s American films